Old City Hall, also known as County Court House and State House, is a historic city hall building located at Lancaster, Lancaster County, Pennsylvania. It was built between 1795 and 1797, and is a 3 1/2-story, brick building with stone accents in the Federal style. The building was restored in 1924. It was built as a "public office house" and housed the Commonwealth offices when Lancaster was the capital from 1799 to 1812. It has also housed city and county offices, a Masonic lodge, a post office, and library. It now houses the Lancaster visitor's center.

It was added to the National Register of Historic Places in 1972.

References

City and town halls on the National Register of Historic Places in Pennsylvania
Federal architecture in Pennsylvania
Former seats of local government
Government buildings completed in 1797
Buildings and structures in Lancaster, Pennsylvania
Tourist attractions in Lancaster, Pennsylvania
National Register of Historic Places in Lancaster, Pennsylvania
City and town halls in Pennsylvania